"The Saturn Game" is a science fiction novella by American writer Poul Anderson, originally published in Analog Science Fiction and Fact in February 1981.

Plot summary
Imaginative roleplaying provides relief for some of the crew on the long, dull trip to Saturn.  However, their imaginary world becomes hazardously confused with the real one when a team begins the exploration of Iapetus, one of Saturn's moons.

Reception
"The Saturn Game" won the 1981 Nebula Award for Best Novella and the 1982 Hugo Award for Best Novella.

Sources, references, external links, quotations

1981 short stories
Hugo Award for Best Novella winning works
Fiction set on Iapetus (moon)
Nebula Award for Best Novella-winning works
Fiction set on Saturn's moons
Novellas by Poul Anderson
Works originally published in Analog Science Fiction and Fact